The Rose and Crown is a Grade II listed public house at 199 Stoke Newington Church Street, Stoke Newington, Hackney, London, N16 9ES.

It was built in 1930–32 for Truman's Brewery, and designed by their in-house architect A. E. Sewell.

It was Grade II listed in 2015 by Historic England.

See also
 List of pubs in London

References

Pubs in the London Borough of Hackney
Grade II listed pubs in London
Stoke Newington
A. E. Sewell buildings